The 2018 WGC-HSBC Champions was a golf tournament played from 25–28 October  2018 at the Sheshan Golf Club in Shanghai, China. It was the tenth WGC-HSBC Champions tournament, and the fourth of four World Golf Championships events held in the 2018 calendar year.

Xander Schauffele beat Tony Finau at the first hole of a sudden-death playoff after making a birdie 4 to Finau's par 5. Defending champion Justin Rose finished third, four strokes behind.

Field
The following is a list of players who qualified for the 2018 WGC-HSBC Champions. The criteria are towards the leaders in points lists rather than tournament winners. Players who qualified from multiple categories will be listed in the first category in which they are eligible with the other qualifying categories in parentheses next to the player's name.

1. Winners of the four major championships and The Players Championship
Brooks Koepka (3,4), Francesco Molinari (3,4,5), Patrick Reed (3,4,5)
Webb Simpson (3,4) did not play.

2. Winners of the previous four World Golf Championships
Justin Rose (3,4,5)
Phil Mickelson (3,4), Justin Thomas (3,4), and Bubba Watson (3,4) did not play.

3. Top 50 from the OWGR on 8 October
An Byeong-hun, Kiradech Aphibarnrat (5), Keegan Bradley (4), Rafa Cabrera-Bello (5), Patrick Cantlay (4), Paul Casey (4), Jason Day (4), Tony Finau (4), Matt Fitzpatrick (5), Tommy Fleetwood (4,5), Branden Grace, Brian Harman, Tyrrell Hatton (5), Charley Hoffman, Billy Horschel (4), Dustin Johnson (4), Satoshi Kodaira, Hideki Matsuyama (4), Rory McIlroy (4,5), Kevin Na (4), Alex Norén (5), Thorbjørn Olesen (5), Ian Poulter (5), Jon Rahm (4,5), Xander Schauffele (4,5), Adam Scott, Cameron Smith (4), Brandt Snedeker, Kyle Stanley (4)
Eddie Pepperell (5) and Henrik Stenson did not play due to injury.
Daniel Berger, Bryson DeChambeau (4), Rickie Fowler (4), Sergio García, Kevin Kisner, Matt Kuchar, Marc Leishman (4), Louis Oosthuizen, Jordan Spieth, Gary Woodland (4), and Tiger Woods (4) did not play.

4. Top 30 from the final 2018 FedEx Cup points list (if there are fewer than five available players, players beyond 30th will be selected to increase the number to five)
Emiliano Grillo, Patton Kizzire, Pan Cheng-tsung, Andrew Putnam, Chez Reavie
Aaron Wise did not play.

5. Top 30 from the Race to Dubai as of 15 October
Lucas Bjerregaard, Alexander Björk, Jorge Campillo, Ryan Fox, Russell Knox, Alexander Lévy, Li Haotong, Adrián Otaegui, Thomas Pieters, Shubhankar Sharma, Brandon Stone, Andy Sullivan, Julian Suri, Matt Wallace

Chris Wood was a late withdrawal with a neck injury and was not replaced in the field.

6. The leading four available players from the Asian Tour Order of Merit as of 15 October
Gaganjeet Bhullar, Justin Harding, Park Sang-hyun, Scott Vincent

7. The leading two available players from the Japan Golf Tour Order of Merit as of 15 October
Yuta Ikeda, Yuki Inamori
Shugo Imahira did not play.

8. The leading two available players from the final 2017 PGA Tour of Australasia Order of Merit
Adam Bland, Brett Rumford

9. The leading two available players from the final 2017–18 Sunshine Tour Order of Merit
George Coetzee, Erik van Rooyen

10. Six players from China
Liang Wenchong, Liu Yanwei, Wu Ashun, Xiao Bowen, Yuan Yechun, Zhang Xinjun

11. Alternates, if needed to fill the field of 78 players
The next available player on the Orders of Merit of the Asian Tour, Japan Golf Tour, Sunshine Tour, and PGA Tour of Australasia, ranked in order of their position in the OWGR as of 8 October
Next available player, not otherwise exempt, from Race to Dubai as of 15 October, OWGR as of 8 October, FedEx Cup list
John Catlin (Asian Tour; no alternates available from Japan Golf Tour)
J. C. Ritchie (Sunshine Tour)
Jason Norris (PGA Tour of Australasia)
Andrea Pavan (Race to Dubai)
Pat Perez (OWGR; Zach Johnson and Luke List did not play)
Adam Hadwin (FedEx Cup)
Sihwan Kim (Asian Tour)
Oliver Bekker (Sunshine Tour)
Jason Scrivener (PGA Tour of Australasia)

Round summaries

First round
Thursday, 25 October 2018

Second round
Friday, 26 October 2018

Third round
Saturday, 27 October 2018

Final round
Sunday, 28 October 2018

Scorecard

Cumulative tournament scores, relative to par
{|class="wikitable" span = 50 style="font-size:85%;
|-
|style="background: Pink;" width=10|
|Birdie
|style="background: PaleGreen;" width=10|
|Bogey
|style="background: Green;" width=10|
|Double bogey
|}
Source:

Playoff

The sudden-death playoff started at the 18th hole.

References

External links
Official site
Coverage on Asian Tour's official site
Coverage on European Tour's official site
Coverage on PGA Tour's official site

WGC-HSBC Champions
WGC-HSBC Champions
WGC-HSBC Champions
WGC-HSBC Champions